Robert Ahrens (born 1970) is a film and theatrical producer based in New York City.

Early life and education
Ahrens grew up in Long Island, New York. He graduated from Cornell University, where he was a member of the Lambda Chi Alpha fraternity. He began his career at the Chase Manhattan Bank.

Career
Ahrens is best known as a producer of the Broadway musical Xanadu, which was nominated for Best Musical at the 2008 Tony Awards. Ahrens began acquiring the stage rights to the Xanadu musical in 2002 after seeing an unauthorized 2001 stage production of the film. Working as an assistant to an executive at Paramount Pictures at the time, he pursued the rights to Xanadu and its soundtrack by the Electric Light Orchestra and swiftly began courting writer Douglas Carter Beane to write the book. 

He produced three films, Bumping Heads, Book of Love, and WTC View.  He also produced Evita on Broadway and executive produced Finding Neverland for Harvey Weinstein.  He has presented Kathy Griffin Wants a Tony, Frankie Valli and the Four Seasons, and The Temptations and The Four Tops on Broadway.

References

External links 
 
 

Cornell University alumni
Film producers from New York (state)
Living people
Businesspeople from New York City
1970 births
Place of birth missing (living people)